Ambedkar Jayanti or Bhim Jayanti is observed on 14 April to commemorate the memory of B. R. Ambedkar, Indian politician and social reformer. It marks Ambedkar's birthday who was born on 14 April 1891.  His birthday is also referred to as 'Equality Day' by some in India.

Ambedkar Jayanti processions are carried out by his followers at Chaitya Bhoomi in Mumbai and Deeksha Bhoomi in Nagpur. It is a customary for senior national figures, such as the President, Prime Minister and leaders of major political parties, to pay homage at the statue of Ambedkar at the Parliament of India in New Delhi. It is celebrated throughout the world especially by  dalits, adivasi, labour workers, women and also those who embraced Buddhism after his example. In India, large numbers of people visit local statues commemorating Ambedkar in procession with lot of fanfare. In 2020, the first online Ambedkar Jayanti was celebrated in the world.

Ambedkar Jayanti is a public holiday in more than 25 states and union territories of India, including Andhra Pradesh, Bihar, Chandigarh, Chhattisgarh, Goa, Gujarat, Haryana, Himachal Pradesh, Jammu and Kashmir, Jharkhand, Karnataka, Kerala, Ladakh, Madhya Pradesh, Maharashtra, Odisha, Pondicherry, Punjab, Rajasthan, Sikkim, Tamil Nadu, Telangana, Uttarakhand, Uttar Pradesh, West Bengal etc.

Background 

Babasaheb Ambedkar's first birthday was publicly celebrated on 14 April 1928 in Pune, by Janardan Sadashiv Ranapisay, who was an Ambedkarite and social activist. He started the tradition of Babasaheb's birth anniversary or Ambedkar Jayanti. Ambedkar passed his matriculation in 1907. Then, he pursued BA honours in economics and political science from Elphinstone college. He enrolled in Columbia University, New York for the Masters of Arts and got his PhD in economics in 1927. In 1916, he took the admission for the Bar Course at Gray's Inn along with this he also did another doctoral thesis in economics from the London School of Economics. Ambedkar was master in 64 subjects and was proficient in 11 languages.

Tributes 
Indian Post issued stamps dedicated to Ambedkar's birthday in 1966, 1973, 1991, 2001, and 2013, and featured him on other stamps in 2009, 2015, 2016, 2017 and 2020.

On 14 April 1990, Ambedkar was bestowed with Bharat Ratna award. The same year his life size portrait was also unveiled in the Central Hall of Parliament. The period from 14 April 1990 — 14 April 1991 was observed as "Year of Social Justice" in the memory of Babasaheb.

Government of India Issued 10 Rupees and 125 Rupees coins in 2015 to mark the 125 Birth Anniversary in the honor of Ambedkar.

On 14 April 2015, a Google Doodle was published for Ambedkar's 124th birthday. The doodle was featured in India, Argentina, Chile, Ireland, Peru, Poland, Sweden and the United Kingdom.

The United Nations celebrated Ambedkar Jayanti in 2016, 2017 and 2018.

In 2017, As per Government of Maharashtra 14 April is observed as Knowledge Day (Dnyan Din) in the Indian state of Maharashtra in memory of Ambedkar.

In 2017, on the occasion of Ambedkar Jayanti, Twitter launched Ambedkar emoji as a tribute to him.

On 6 April 2020, in Canada, it was decided to observe April 14 as "Dr. B.R. Ambedkar Day of Equality". The decision was taken by the Council of the City of Burnaby, Canada.

In 2021, Government of British Columbia has decided to observe April 14 as "Dr. B. R. Ambedkar Equality Day" in the province of British Columbia, Canada.

In 2022, Canada's British Columbia province has recognised April as Dalit History Month.

In 2022, The Government of British Columbia (Canada) observes 14 April as "Dr. B.R. Ambedkar Equality Day" in British Columbia, Canada.

In 2022, The Government of Colorado (United States) observes 14 April 2022 as "Dr. B.R. Ambedkar Equity Day" in Colorado, the United States.

In 2022, The Government of Tamil Nadu (India) observes Ambedkar Jayanti (14 April) as "Equity Day" in Tamil Nadu state.

See also

References

External links 

 125th Dr. Ambedkar Birthday Celebrations Around the World

April observances
Birthdays
Public holidays in India